Urs Hugi (born 25 July 1952) is a Swiss modern pentathlete. He competed at the 1972 Summer Olympics.

References

1952 births
Living people
Swiss male modern pentathletes
Olympic modern pentathletes of Switzerland
Modern pentathletes at the 1972 Summer Olympics